Cory's shearwater (Calonectris borealis) is a large shearwater in the seabird family Procellariidae. It breeds colonially of rocky islands in the eastern Atlantic. Outside the breeding season it ranges widely in the Atlantic. It was formerly considered to be conspecific with Scopoli's shearwater.

Taxonomy
Cory's shearwater was formally described in 1881 by the American ornithologist Charles B. Cory from a specimen collected off Chatham Island, Massachusetts. He coined the binomial name Puffinus borealis. Cory's shearwater is now placed in the genus Calonectris that was introduced in 1915 by the ornithologists Gregory Mathews and Tom Iredale. The genus name combines the Ancient Greek kalos meaning "good" or "noble" with the genus name Nectris that was used for shearwaters by the German naturalist Heinrich Kuhl in 1820. The name Nectris comes from the Ancient Greek nēktris meaning "swimmer". The specific epithet borealis is Latin and means "north". The species is considered to be monotypic: no subspecies are recognised.

The Cape Verde shearwater C. edwardsii (Oustalet, 1883) was once considered a subspecies of Cory's shearwater but has been split off as a separate species . It is endemic to the Cape Verde Islands. It has an all dark, slim bill, and darker head and upperparts than Cory's. The flight has been described as rather more typically shearwater-like than the Cory's, with stiffer and more rapid wing beats.

Scopoli's shearwater and Cory's shearwater were previously considered as conspecific. They formed the Cory's shearwater complex (Calonectris diomedea). Based on the lack of hybridization and differences in mitochondrial DNA, morphology and vocalization, the complex was split into two separate species. The English name "Cory's shearwater" was transferred to Calonectris borealis while what was previously the nominate subspecies became Scopoli's shearwater (Calonectris diomedea).

Description
It has brownish-grey upperparts, white underparts and a yellowish bill. It lacks the brown belly patch, dark shoulder markings and black cap of the great shearwater.

Distribution and habitat
This species breeds on Madeira, the Azores and the Berlengas Archipelago in Portugal and the Canary Islands in Spain.

Behaviour and ecology
This bird flies with long glides, and always with wings bowed and angled slightly back, unlike the stiff, straight-winged flight of the similarly sized great shearwater.

Breeding
They nest on open ground or among rocks or less often in a burrow where one white egg is laid. The burrow is visited at night to minimise predation from large gulls. In late summer and autumn, most birds migrate into the Atlantic as far north as the south-western coasts of Great Britain and Ireland. They return to the Mediterranean in February. The biggest colony is located in Savage Islands, Madeira.

Food and feeding
Cory's shearwater feeds on fish, molluscs and offal, and can dive deep ( or more) in search of prey.  It readily follows fishing boats, where it indulges in noisy squabbles. This is a gregarious species, which can be seen in large numbers from ships or appropriate headlands. The Bay of Biscay ferries are particularly good for this species. It is silent at sea, but at night the breeding colonies are alive with raucous cackling calls.

Gallery

Notes

References

External links

 Cory's Shearwater Species text in The Atlas of Southern African Birds
 BTO BirdFacts – Cory's shearwater

Further reading
 Rodríguez A, Rodríguez B, Negro JJ (2015) GPS tracking for mapping seabird mortality induced by light pollution. Scientific Reports 5: 10670. doi:10.1038/srep10670
 Rodríguez A, Rodríguez B, Carrasco MN (2012) High prevalence of parental delivery of plastic debris in Cory's shearwaters (Calonectris diomedea). Marine Pollution Bulletin 64: 2219–2223. doi:10.1016/j.marpolbul.2012.06.011
 

Cory's shearwater
Birds of the Atlantic Ocean
Birds of Madeira
Cory's shearwater
Cory's shearwater